Ram Singh Shakya is an Indian politician.  He was elected to the Lok Sabha, the lower house of the Parliament of India from Etawah, Uttar Pradesh.

References

External links
 Official biographical sketch in Parliament of India website

Lok Sabha members from Uttar Pradesh
India MPs 1980–1984
India MPs 1989–1991
India MPs 1996–1997
1944 births
Living people
Janata Dal politicians
Samajwadi Party politicians
Lok Dal politicians
Janata Party (Secular) politicians
Jharkhand Party politicians